Phycosiphon is an ichnogenus of trace fossil. The first recorded fossil was found in Scunthorpe, United Kingdom.

See also
 Ichnology

External links
 Chuck D. Howell's Ichnogenera Photos

Trace fossils